The shot heard round the world is a nickname given for the opening gunshot fired in the Battles of Lexington and Concord on April 19, 1775, which began the American Revolutionary War.

Shot heard round the world may also refer to:
 The Assassination of Archduke Franz Ferdinand in 1914
 Shot Heard 'Round the World (baseball), a game-winning walk-off home run by New York Giants outfielder Bobby Thomson to win the National League pennant in 1951
 Shot heard round the world (soccer), Paul Caligiuri's winning goal for the United States men's national soccer team in the final qualifying round for the 1990 FIFA World Cup
 Shot heard round the world, a double eagle made by golfer Gene Sarazen on the 15th hole in the final round of the 1935 Masters Tournament
 "The Shot Heard Round the World", a song from Schoolhouse Rock!
 "The Shot Heard 'Round the World", a song by Boys Like Girls from Love Drunk

See also
Hit heard round the world, an event in the 1964 American Football League Championship Game
The slap heard around the world